Akari Fujinami (born 11 November 2003) is a Japanese freestyle wrestler. Her older brother is 2017 World Wrestling Championships bronze medalist Yuhi Fujinami.

She won the gold medal in the women's 53 kg event at the 2021 World Wrestling Championships held in Oslo, Norway. She also won the gold medal in her event at the 2022 Asian Wrestling Championships held in Ulaanbaatar, Mongolia.

References

External links
 

Living people
2003 births
People from Yokkaichi
Japanese female sport wrestlers
World Wrestling Championships medalists
Asian Wrestling Championships medalists
21st-century Japanese women